Gordon Vincent Sundin (October 10, 1937 – May 2, 2016) was an American baseball player. He was a right-handed pitcher whose professional career lasted for six seasons (1955–1959; 1961), but who made only one appearance in Major League Baseball — failing to record an out — for the  Baltimore Orioles.

Sundin's lone MLB appearance came on Wednesday, September 19, 1956, at Briggs Stadium against the Detroit Tigers. Baltimore was already behind, 8–1, when Sundin, three weeks shy of his 19th birthday, came into the game in the bottom half of the eighth inning. He faced two batters — Tiger pitcher Frank Lary and Harvey Kuenn — and issued two bases on balls before he was relieved by Billy O'Dell. Lary would later score an earned run charged against Sundin (giving the Baltimore pitcher an earned run average of infinity per baseball's statistics).

Sundin's catcher for that game was Tom Gastall, who entered the game with Sundin in the middle of the eighth.  The next day, Gastall was killed in a plane crash.

Sundin compiled a 14–23 win-loss record and a 5.86 ERA in 5 seasons of minor league baseball, retiring in 1961 at the age of 23.

References

External links

1937 births
2016 deaths
Amarillo Gold Sox players
Baltimore Orioles players
Baseball players from Minneapolis
Knoxville Smokies players
Major League Baseball pitchers
Minnesota Golden Gophers baseball players
Phoenix Stars players
Sportspeople from Naples, Florida
Tri-City Atoms players
Vancouver Mounties players
York White Roses players